The 2013–14 FK-League was the fourth season of the FK-League. The season began on 30 November 2013, and ended on 23 March 2014.

League table

Group A

Group B

Overall

Playoff

Awards 

 MVP: Shin Jong-Hoon (전주 매그 FC)
 Top Scorer: Choi Gyeong-Jin (Seoul Eunpyeong FS, 70 goals)
 Best Goalkeeper: Han Min-Gyu (Jeonju MAG FC)

FK-League
Futsal in South Korea